This is a list of the members of the Dewan Rakyat (House of Representatives) of the 10th Parliament of Malaysia, elected in 1999.

Composition

Seating arrangement
This is the seating arrangement as of its last meeting on 11 November 2003. In addition, there were a seat that is labelled as VACANT, namely Kangar. The seat vacancy is due to the resignation of the incumbent Member of Parliament (MP) for the constituency to assume his new post as Senate president, which occur on 3 July 2003 respectively.

Elected members by state


Unless noted otherwise, the MPs served the entire term of the parliament (from 20 December 1999 until 4 March 2004).

Perlis

Kedah

Kelantan

Terengganu

Penang

Perak

Pahang

Selangor

Federal Territory of Kuala Lumpur

Negeri Sembilan

Malacca

Johor

Federal Territory of Labuan

Sabah

Sarawak

Notes

References

Andrighetti, V., Sunai, P., Asian Network for Free Elections., & Asian Forum for Human Rights and Development. (2000). Malaysia: Report of the 1999 Election Observation Mission, 25 November-1 December. Bangkok, Thailand: Asian Network for Free Elections. 
Anzagain Sdn. Bhd. (2004). Almanak keputusan pilihan raya umum: Parlimen & Dewan Undangan Negeri, 1959-1999. Shah Alam, Selangor: Anzagain. 
Faisal, S. H. (2012). Domination and Contestation: Muslim Bumiputera Politics in Sarawak. Institute of Southeast Asian Studies.

Malaysian parliaments
Lists of members of the Dewan Rakyat